Horst is a municipality in the district of Steinburg, in Schleswig-Holstein, Germany. It is situated approximately 14 km southeast of Itzehoe, and 7 km northwest of Elmshorn.

Horst is the seat of the Amt ("collective municipality") Horst-Herzhorn.

References

Steinburg